Trochulus graminicola is a species of small, air-breathing land snail, a terrestrial pulmonate gastropod mollusk in the family Hygromiidae, the hairy snails and their allies. This species is endemic to Germany.

References

External links 
 Trochulus graminicola at AnimalBase

Hygromiidae
Gastropods described in 1973
Endemic fauna of Germany
Taxonomy articles created by Polbot